The Archdiocese of Udine is a Latin Church ecclesiastical territory or archdiocese of the Catholic Church in Italy. The see was established in 1751 when the Patriarchal see of Aquileia was divided. From 1818 to 1846 it was a suffragan diocese of the Patriarch of Venice.

History

Bishops and Archbishops of Udine

Archbishops of Udine, 1751–1818
 Cardinal Daniele Delfino (6 Jul 1751 Appointed – 13 Mar 1762 Died), former Patriarch of Aquileia
 Archbishop Bartolomeo Gradenigo (13 Mar 1762 Succeeded – 2 Nov 1765 Died)
 Archbishop Giovanni Hieronymo Gradenigo, C.R. † (27 Jan 1766 Appointed – 1786 Died)
 Archbishop Niccolò Sagredo ( 1786 Appointed – 1792 Died)
 Cardinal Pietro Antonio Zorzi, C.R.S. † (24 Sep 1792 Appointed – 17 Dec 1803 Died)
 Archbishop Baldassare Rasponti (18 Sep 1807 Appointed – 14 Feb 1814 Died)

Bishops of Udine, 1818–1846
 Bishop Emmanuele Lodi, O.P. (28 Aug 1819 Appointed – Feb 1845 Died)
 Archbishop Zaccaria Bricito (21 Dec 1846 Appointed – 6 Feb 1851 Died)

Archbishops of Udine, 1846–present
 Cardinal Giuseppe Luigi Trevisanato (27 Sep 1852 Appointed – 7 Apr 1862 Appointed, Patriarch of Venice)
 Archbishop Andrea Casasola (28 Sep 1863 Appointed – 1884 Died)
 Archbishop Giovanni Maria Berengo (10 Nov 1884 Appointed – 1896 Died)
 Archbishop Pietro Zamburlini (22 Jun 1896 Appointed – 1909 Died)
 Archbishop Antonio Anastasio Rossi (8 Jan 1910 Appointed – 19 Dec 1927 Appointed, Latin Patriarch of Constantinople)
 Archbishop Giuseppe Nogara (27 Jan 1928 Appointed – 9 Dec 1955 Died)
 Archbishop Giuseppe Zaffonato (31 Jan 1956 Appointed – 29 Sep 1972 Resigned)
 Archbishop Alfredo Battisti (13 Dec 1972 Appointed – 28 Oct 2000 Retired)
 Archbishop Pietro Brollo (28 Oct 2000 Appointed – 20 Aug 2009 Retired)
 Archbishop Andrea Bruno Mazzocato (20 Aug 2009 Appointed – )

See also
 Archbishop of Gorizia (Görz)
 Patriarch of Aquileia

References

Books
 p. 775.

Studies

Religious organizations established in 1751
Udine
Udine
Udine
1751 establishments in Europe